The Arly is a 32.1 km long river in the departments of Savoie and Haute-Savoie, France. It is a tributary of the Isère, which it joins at Albertville.

Towns crossed by the river
 Megève
 Praz-sur-Arly
 Flumet
 Saint-Nicolas-la-Chapelle
 Crest-Voland
 Héry-sur-Ugine
 Cohennoz
 Ugine
 Marthod
 Albertville

Tributaries
 Arrondine
 Flon
 Chaise
 Doron de Beaufort

See also
 Rivers of France

References

Rivers of France
Rivers of Savoie
Rivers of Haute-Savoie
Rivers of Auvergne-Rhône-Alpes
Rivers of the Alps